Federico Moretti (born 16 September 1994) is an Italian professional footballer who plays as a forward for  club Ancona-Matelica.

Club career 
Born in Teramo, Moretti started his career with Serie C2 club Milazzo.

In 2019, he joined Matelica Calcio. On 27 June 2021, he renew his contract with the club, under the new name Ancona-Matelica.

References

External links
 
 

1994 births
Living people
People from Teramo
Footballers from Abruzzo
Italian footballers
Association football forwards
Serie C players
Serie D players
Eccellenza players
S.S. Milazzo players
A.S.D. Riccione 1929 players
S.S. Matelica Calcio 1921 players
Ancona-Matelica players
Sportspeople from the Province of Teramo